Labrys okinawensis is a bacterium from the family Xanthobacteraceae which has been isolated from root nodule from the plant Entada phaseoloides in Okinawa in Japan.

References

Further reading

External links
Type strain of Labrys okinawensis at BacDive -  the Bacterial Diversity Metadatabase

Hyphomicrobiales
Bacteria described in 2007